Hindu Gymkhana may mean:

 Hindu Gymkhana, Karachi, a gymkhana in Karachi
 Hindu Gymkhana, Mumbai, a gymkhana in Mumbai
 Hindu Gymkhana, Pune, a gymkhana in Pune